Stelis batillacea is a species of orchid plant native to Ecuador.

References 

batillacea
Flora of Ecuador
Plants described in 1976